Max is a rapid transit station on the Red Line of the Dubai Metro in Dubai, UAE.

The station serves Al Jafilia and surrounding areas. It is located on the Sheikh Khalifa Bin Zayed Road, providing access to Zabeel Park and several office buildings.

The station is the only one in the system to have a siding. This allows two trains to be stored to the east of the station.

On 4 August 2021 this station was renamed from "Al Jafilia" to "Max" after the Max Fashion brand.

Platform layout

References

Railway stations in the United Arab Emirates opened in 2009
Dubai Metro stations